Claudia Rivas Vega (born 15 June 1989) is a Mexican triathlete. She competed in the women's event at the 2012 Summer Olympics. She competed in the women's event at the 2015 Pan American Games, but failed to finish.

She finished 9th in the women's event at the 2016 Olympic Games, the best ever from a Mexican triathlete of any gender.

References

External links
 

1989 births
Living people
Mexican female triathletes
Olympic triathletes of Mexico
Triathletes at the 2012 Summer Olympics
Triathletes at the 2016 Summer Olympics
Triathletes at the 2015 Pan American Games
Triathletes at the 2019 Pan American Games
Sportspeople from Zacatecas
Central American and Caribbean Games gold medalists for Mexico
Competitors at the 2018 Central American and Caribbean Games
Pan American Games medalists in triathlon
Pan American Games bronze medalists for Mexico
Central American and Caribbean Games medalists in triathlon
Medalists at the 2019 Pan American Games
Triathletes at the 2020 Summer Olympics
21st-century Mexican women